Glass Onion: A Knives Out Mystery (titled onscreen as simply Glass Onion) is a 2022 American mystery film written and directed by Rian Johnson and produced by Johnson and Ram Bergman. It is a standalone sequel to the 2019 film Knives Out, with Daniel Craig reprising his role as master detective Benoit Blanc as he takes on a new case revolving around tech billionaire Miles Bron (played by Edward Norton) and his closest friends. The ensemble cast also includes Janelle Monáe, Kathryn Hahn, Leslie Odom Jr., Jessica Henwick, Madelyn Cline, Kate Hudson, and Dave Bautista.

Johnson had considered several films featuring the Benoit Blanc character before the first film's release. A sequel was greenlit by its original distributor Lionsgate in 2020, but in March 2021 Netflix bought the rights to two Knives Out sequels for $469 million. The cast signed on that May. Filming took place with a $40 million budget on the island of Spetses, Greece, in June and July 2021, and continued in Belgrade, Serbia, until September. The second sequel is in development as of February 2023.

Following its world premiere at the Toronto International Film Festival on September 10, 2022, Glass Onion began a one-week limited theatrical release on November 23, 2022, receiving the widest theatrical release ever for a Netflix film and grossing $15 million; Netflix began streaming it on December 23. Like its predecessor, Glass Onion received critical acclaim, with reviewers praising Johnson's screenplay and direction, the performances of the cast, and the musical score. The National Board of Review named Glass Onion as one of the top ten films of 2022. The film received a nomination for Best Adapted Screenplay at the 95th Academy Awards, and received numerous other accolades.

Plot 

During the COVID-19 pandemic in May 2020, Miles Bron, the billionaire co-founder of technology company Alpha, hosts a murder mystery game at the Glass Onion, his mansion on a private island in Greece. He invites five friends: Alpha head scientist Lionel Toussaint, Connecticut governor Claire Debella, controversial fashion designer and model Birdie Jay, men's rights streamer Duke Cody, and ousted Alpha co-founder Cassandra "Andi" Brand. The five friends are delivered a wooden puzzle box to decipher to find the invitation inside. The five travel to Miles's island, along with Birdie's assistant Peg and Duke's girlfriend Whiskey. Famous detective Benoit Blanc joins them; although Miles says he did not invite Blanc, he allows Blanc to stay, assuming another guest sent him an invitation as a joke. 

Before dinner, Miles shows off his valuable glass sculptures, as well as the Mona Lisa, which he has on loan from the Louvre. Miles also reveals that the mansion is powered by "Klear", a hydrogen-based alternative fuel that Alpha will launch imminently, despite Lionel and Claire's concerns that it is untested and dangerous.

Blanc solves Miles's murder mystery game immediately and privately warns Miles that his guests have motives to kill him. After an argument with the rest of the group, Andi storms off. Duke dies after drinking from Miles's glass, and the panicked group suspects Andi of attempting to poison Miles. The police are summoned but will not arrive until morning. After the group discovers Duke's pistol is missing, the power goes out, and everyone splits up. In the dark, Blanc finds Andi, but an unseen assailant shoots her. Blanc gathers the group and announces that he has solved Andi's murder.

An extended flashback shows that Andi actually died a week earlier, apparently by suicide; her twin sister Helen hired Blanc to investigate. At Alpha, Andi had halted Klear's development because of its dangerous properties, so Miles had her removed as CEO; his case was aided by their friends perjuring themselves to testify that Miles had single-handedly sketched out the plan for Alpha on a napkin years before. The napkin was actually Andi's work; shortly before her death, she emailed the group a photo showing the original napkin still in her possession. Helen suspects that someone in the group killed Andi and stole the napkin to protect Miles. With Andi's death not yet public knowledge, Blanc persuaded Helen to pose as Andi at Miles's party and help him investigate.

Helen helps Blanc discover motives for Miles's friends to protect Miles from Andi: Lionel and Claire have staked their reputations on Klear, Miles is financially rescuing Birdie from the fallout of ignorantly employing sweatshops, and Duke hopes Miles will give him a show on Alpha News. Helen discovers that each of Miles's friends visited Andi's home on the day she died. She searches the guests' rooms but does not find the napkin. When Helen is shot, Andi's journal in her jacket pocket stops the bullet. Blanc fakes her death so that she can search Miles's office.

Blanc deduces that Miles committed both murders. He killed Andi after learning she had the napkin, but Duke saw him leaving her house in his car. During the party, Duke saw a news report of Andi's death and, realizing that Miles was responsible, attempted to blackmail him. This prompted Miles to poison him with pineapple juice, to which Duke was deathly allergic, and to take Duke's pistol, with which he shot Helen. 

Helen locates Andi's napkin in Miles's office and reveals her identity to the group. However, Miles burns the napkin, eliminating the evidence, and his friends refuse to testify against him. Blanc tells Helen that he has done all he can and goes outside. In a cathartic rage, Helen destroys Miles's glass sculptures; Miles's friends watch her and eventually join in. Helen lights a bonfire and throws in a shard of Klear Blanc slipped her, causing the hazardous material to explode, destroying the mansion and the Mona Lisa. Realizing the painting's destruction will reveal that Klear is dangerous and ruin Miles, the group decides to testify against him. At the beach, Helen and Blanc watch as police boats arrive.

Cast

 Daniel Craig as Benoit Blanc, a private investigator
 Edward Norton as Miles Bron, a billionaire and owner of a large technology company
 Janelle Monáe as Helen and Andi Brand, twin sisters, the latter being Miles's ex-business partner
 Kathryn Hahn as Claire Debella, the governor of Connecticut, now running for the United States Senate
 Leslie Odom Jr. as Lionel Toussaint, the head scientist for Miles's company
 Kate Hudson as Birdie Jay, a hedonistic, politically incorrect former supermodel turned fashion designer in Manhattan
 Dave Bautista as Duke Cody, a video game streamer and men's rights activist on Twitch and YouTube
 Jessica Henwick as Peg, Birdie's assistant
 Madelyn Cline as Whiskey, Duke's girlfriend and Twitch channel assistant
 Noah Segan as Derol, a slacker who lives on Miles's island. Segan previously appeared in Knives Out (2019) as Trooper Wagner
 Jackie Hoffman as Ma, Duke's mother
 Dallas Roberts as Devon Debella, Claire's husband

Additionally, Ethan Hawke appears briefly as Miles's assistant (credited as "Efficient Man"), Hugh Grant cameos as Phillip, Blanc's domestic partner, and Joseph Gordon-Levitt voices Miles's clock, the Hourly Dong; Gordon-Levitt had a vocal cameo in the previous film as Detective Hardrock. Several celebrities make cameo appearances as themselves, including Stephen Sondheim, Angela Lansbury, Natasha Lyonne, Kareem Abdul-Jabbar, Yo-Yo Ma, Jake Tapper, and Serena Williams. Sondheim and Lansbury both died before Glass Onion was released, and the film is dedicated to both of them. Jared Leto and Jeremy Renner's likenesses appear on bottles of kombucha and hot sauce, respectively.

Production

Development 

The 2019 film Knives Out was a commercially successful production from MRC and Lionsgate Films. It grossed over $311 million on a budget of $40 million, making it the third-highest-grossing original movie of the year that was not based on existing intellectual property. Before its release, writer and director Rian Johnson had teased the possibility of a sequel revolving around the lead character, Detective Benoit Blanc. Lionsgate officially greenlighted the sequel in early 2020.

In March 2021, Netflix outbid Amazon and Apple at an auction to acquire the rights to the film and another sequel to Knives Out for $469 million, with Johnson returning as director, Daniel Craig set to reprise his role as Blanc, and a budget of at least $40 million for the first installment. Johnson, Craig, and the producer Ram Bergman reportedly earned more than $100 million for both productions. A losing bidder called it an inexplicable and "mind-boggling" deal.

Craig worked with a dialect coach to regain familiarity with Blanc's Southern accent. Johnson previously considered having Blanc speak with an inexplicably different accent in each film.

Writing 
Johnson wrote Glass Onion in 2020 during the COVID-19 lockdown, with its setting of Greece coming from a desire to travel abroad when international travel had been shut down. His writing began from the premise that he wanted to write a whodunnit "vacation mystery" in the style of stories Johnson loves such as Evil Under the Sun, Death on the Nile and The Last of Sheila. Johnson made it clear that Glass Onion was not a continuation of its predecessor but a standalone film featuring a new story and cast, similar to the Hercule Poirot novel series by Agatha Christie.

In addition to Christie novels, he took inspiration from "tropical getaway murder mysteries" like the film adaptation of Christie's Evil Under the Sun and especially The Last of Sheila, saying: "It's structured around a group of friends, or frenemies, who all have a power dynamic with one of their successful friends. It begins with him inviting them to come and play this murder mystery game at this exotic locale. In The Last of Sheila, it's on his yacht, and everything ends up going horribly wrong. That is essentially how Glass Onion begins." Johnson wanted the film's title to refer to something hidden in plain sight. He chose "glass" because it is clear, and he searched his phone for songs with the word. He decided "Glass Onion" by the Beatles. The song is featured in the end credits.

The character of Benoit Blanc was revealed as gay in the film. Johnson said this "did not feel like a big decision" and "felt very natural" when depicting Blanc's home life.

Casting 
Johnson described casting the film as "throwing a dinner party". Dave Bautista said Johnson encouraged him to audition during an unprompted call, and Kathryn Hahn secured her role over several Zoom calls with Johnson.

Filming 
Returning Knives Out crew members included cinematographer Steve Yedlin, editor Bob Ducsay, and composer Nathan Johnson. Filming began in Spetses, an island in Greece, on June 28, 2021. Johnson discovered the Amanzoe's Villa 20 in Porto Heli and decided to use it as a major filming location. It also housed the cast and their families for the majority of the shoot, which Johnson described as "a summer vacation where we also made a movie". The shoot moved out of Greece on July 30 to continue shooting interior and New York scenes in Belgrade, and wrapped officially on September 13, 2021.

In addition to the title, he film contains references to other songs by the Beatles; two of the glass sculptures include a walrus ("I Am the Walrus") and strawberries ("Strawberry Fields Forever"), and the switch that controls the safety enclosure around the Mona Lisa is modeled as "The Fool on the Hill".

Music 

Rian's cousin and frequent collaborator, Nathan Johnson, returned to score Glass Onion; it marks their fifth collaboration after Brick (2005), The Brothers Bloom (2009), Looper (2012), and the predecessor, Knives Out (2019). Netflix Music released the album on November 25, 2022.

Other songs featured in the film include "Under the Bridge" by Red Hot Chili Peppers; "Star"; "To Love Somebody" by the Bee Gees;  "Starman" by David Bowie; "Take Me Home, Country Roads" by Toots and The Maytals; and "Mona Lisa" by Nat King Cole.  Edward Norton plays "Blackbird" by The Beatles on guitar. "Glass Onion" by The Beatles plays during the end credits.

Release

Marketing 
A Glass Onion teaser trailer was released on September 8, 2022, followed by a full trailer on November 7, 2022.

Johnson said he was "pissed" that A Knives Out Mystery was added as the subtitle, originally intending the film to be titled Glass Onion and act as a standalone story. While he said he understood the need for audiences to understand that Glass Onion was part of a series, he believes that "the whole appeal to me is it’s a new novel off the shelf every time" and that there is an industry trend with "the gravity of a thousand suns toward serialized storytelling".

Theatrical and streaming 
Glass Onion premiered at the Toronto International Film Festival on September 10, 2022. It also screened at the Philadelphia Film Festival in October 2022, closed the BFI London Film Festival on October 16 and Film Fest 919 on October 30, 2022, and screened at the Miami International Film Festival as its opening night film on November 3, 2022. It was released on Netflix on December 23, 2022. Over its first 10 days of digital release, the film logged over 209.5 million hours viewed worldwide.

Netflix was reportedly considering a new release model for films like Glass Onion, which would give the film a 45-day window in theaters before being released on the streaming service. On October 6, 2022, Netflix announced that after signing deals with the three largest theater chains in the United States (AMC Theaters, Regal Cinemas, and Cinemark, the latter of whom Netflix had a pre-existing deal with), the film would see a limited one-week theatrical release (billed as a "sneak preview" release) from November 23 to 29, 2022, in roughly 600 theaters in the largest markets across the United States as well in other international markets, marking the first time a Netflix-distributed film would be shown in all three major theater chains in the United States. After the release was over, Netflix would then pull the film from distribution until the Netflix release on December 23. At that point, Netflix would allow theaters to show the film again. Deadline later reported that Netflix agreed to take a lower amount of the rental revenue than usual from theaters (40% vs. 60–70%), as well as to kick in four times the average amount of money for exhibitor marketing. Deadline also reported that some smaller exhibitors that were interested in playing the film were shut out from the one-week limited release, as Netflix preferred more popular theaters for Glass Onion.

Home media 
On December 23, 2022, in an interview with TheWrap, Johnson and Bergman confirmed that discussions between Netflix and the creatives about a possible Blu-ray release of the film had taken place, with Bergman saying, "There have been conversations but no results yet. I really hope we can do it. We've got plenty of good stuff to fill out a disc if anyone's interested." Johnson—a longtime advocate of physical media—also was hopeful, saying that even if it does not come to fruition, he will strive to make an audio commentary available in some form.

Reception

Box office 
In the United States and Canada, Glass Onion: A Knives Out Mystery was released alongside Strange World, Devotion, and Bones and All and The Fabelmans, and was initially projected to gross around $6–8 million from 698 theaters over its five-day opening weekend. As with their other theatrical releases, Netflix did not release any box office numbers for the film. Deadline Hollywood reported that the film made an estimated $2–2.5 million on its first day, which led to estimates being raised to as much as $12.3 million. The Hollywood Reporter later reported that the film went on to debut with an estimated $13.1 million over the five-day weekend, which would be the best-performing theatrical release for Netflix, and third for the weekend had Netflix officially released box office numbers, behind Black Panther: Wakanda Forever and Strange World.

Critical response 
 

Varietys Owen Gleiberman praised the film as "a bigger, showier, even more elaborately multi-faceted shell-game mystery" than the first film. Christy Lemire of RogerEbert.com gave the film 3 out of 4 stars, writing: "The clever details, amusing name-drops, and precisely pointed digs at vapid celebrity culture keep Johnson's movie zippy when it threatens to drag." Writing for The Guardian, Peter Bradshaw gave the film 4 out of 5 stars and said: "Glass Onion is never anything less than entertaining, with its succession of A-lister and A-plus-lister cameos popping up all over the place. And Johnson uncorks an absolute showstopper of a flashback a half-hour or so into the action, which then unspools back up to the present day, giving us all manner of cheeky POV-shift reveals."

The film's characters and plot have been likened to current business magnates. Calder McHugh of Politico described the film as "an allegory for all of us living with the omnipresent Elon Musk, Donald Trump, and Jeff Bezos", while James Downie of MSNBC claimed Norton's character Miles Bron's "mixture of bluster, hubris, and half-baked ideas will likely bring to mind Twitter owner and part-time car enthusiast Elon Musk." Of the film's relevance to Elon Musk's recent takeover of Twitter, Rian Johnson commented, "A friend of mine said, 'Man, that feels like it was written this afternoon.' And that's just sort of a horrible, horrible accident, you know?" Shirley Li of The Atlantic praised the film for "observing the absurd privileges of wealth and skewering the ignorance of the 1 percent" such as in the "overflowing smarm" of Edward Norton's performance as Miles Bron. Clay Cockrell, a therapist for rich people, writing in The Guardian said that the film illustrated how the very rich could not trust either their pre-wealth friends, or new friends, as he had seen in real life.

Accolades 

At the 95th Academy Awards, Glass Onion: A Knives Out Mystery received a nomination for Best Adapted Screenplay. The film's other nominations include six Critics' Choice Movie Awards (winning two) and two Golden Globe Awards. It was named one of the ten best films of 2022 by the National Board of Review.

Sequel 
Netflix holds the film rights to at least one more film in the series. In September 2022, Johnson confirmed his intention to make more. Later that month Craig and Johnson separately said that they would continue making further films in the series, so long as they were both involved together. In November 2022, Johnson said that he was preparing to work on writing the third film. By January 2023, Johnson confirmed that he had started writing the script for the third film, stating that it will be tonally and thematically different from the previous installments. Johnson later stated that though he had approved the subtitle of the previous installment, he would like to rename the series and add A Benoit Blanc Mystery as subtitles to future installments.

References

External links
Screenplay
 
 

Knives Out
2020s American films
2020s comedy mystery films
2020s comedy thriller films
2020s crime comedy films
2020s English-language films
2020s mystery thriller films
2022 black comedy films
2022 crime thriller films
American black comedy films
American comedy mystery films
American comedy thriller films
American crime comedy films
American crime thriller films
American detective films
American mystery thriller films
American nonlinear narrative films
American sequel films
English-language Netflix original films
Films about the COVID-19 pandemic
Films about twin sisters
Films about writers
Films directed by Rian Johnson
Films produced by Ram Bergman
Films scored by Nathan Johnson (musician)
Films set in 2020
Films set in Connecticut
Films set in Greece
Films set in Manhattan
Films set on fictional islands
Films shot in Belgrade
Films shot in Greece
Films with screenplays by Rian Johnson
Murder mystery films
Mona Lisa